The Commissioner for the Retention and Use of Biometric Material is an independent advisor to the British government regarding the use and retention of biometrics, including fingerprint data and DNA samples, by the government. The post was created under section 20 of chapter 1 of the Protection of Freedoms Act 2012.

In 2014, the commissioner was Alastair R. MacGregor QC.

As of 2020, the current commissioner is Professor Paul Wiles

In March 2021 the UK government combined the roles of Biometrics Commissioner with those of the Surveillance Camera Commissioner and appointed Prof Fraser Sampson to the role.

References

External links 
 https://www.gov.uk/government/organisations/biometrics-commissioner

Biometrics